The R560 is a Regional Route in South Africa that connects Magaliesburg with Hartbeespoort.

Route
Its western origin is the R24 near Magaliesburg in Gauteng. It heads north-east, intersecting with the R563's north-western terminus at Hekpoort, then crossing into North West and reaching its end at an intersection with the R512 (Pampoen Nek Highway) on the western edge of Hartbeespoort Dam (west of Hartbeespoort and north-west of Broederstroom).

References

Regional Routes in Gauteng
Regional Routes in North West (South African province)